Prince William of Gloucester (William Henry Andrew Frederick; 18 December 1941 – 28 August 1972) was a grandson of King George V and paternal cousin of Queen Elizabeth II. At birth he was fourth in line to the throne; he was ninth in line at the time of his death.

A Cambridge and Stanford graduate, he joined the Foreign and Commonwealth Office serving in Lagos and Tokyo, before returning to take over royal duties. He led an active life, flying Piper aircraft, trekking through the Sahara, and hot air ballooning.

He was the most recent descendant of George III to be diagnosed with porphyria, probably hereditary, which is conjectured to be the illness that caused George III's mental breakdown.

Prince William died in 1972, aged 30, in an air crash while piloting his plane in a competition.

Early life

Prince William was born at Hadley Common, Hertfordshire. His father was Prince Henry, Duke of Gloucester, the third son of King George V and Queen Mary. His mother was Alice, Duchess of Gloucester, the third daughter of the 7th Duke of Buccleuch and Lady Margaret Bridgeman.

He was baptised in the Private Chapel at Windsor Castle on 22 February 1942 by Cosmo Gordon Lang, Archbishop of Canterbury. His godparents were King George VI (his paternal uncle), Queen Mary (his paternal grandmother), Princess Helena Victoria (his cousin), Lady Margaret Hawkins (his maternal aunt), Major Lord William Montagu Douglas Scott (his maternal uncle) and Lord Gort, who was unable to attend. Because of the war, newspapers did not identify the actual location of the christening, and said instead that it took place at "a private chapel in the country".

At the time of his birth, and for months afterwards, Prince Henry was away on military duties, some of which meant considerable risk. This prompted George VI to write to his sister-in-law, promising that, if anything should happen to his brother, he would become Prince William's guardian.

In 1947, Prince William was a page boy for his cousin Princess Elizabeth at her wedding to Philip, Duke of Edinburgh. The other page boy was Prince Michael of Kent. In 1953, he attended the coronation of Elizabeth II.

Prince William spent his early childhood at Barnwell Manor in Northamptonshire and later in Canberra, Australia, where his father served as Governor-General from 1945 to 1947. After returning to England, he received his education at Wellesley House School, a prep school at Broadstairs in Kent, then at Eton College, where he achieved mention in the Eton College Chronicle for his performance in junior cricket and achieved house colours for football. After leaving Eton in 1960, he went up to Magdalene College, Cambridge, to read history, graduating with a BA degree in 1963, subsequently raised to an MA (Cantab.) degree in 1968. After Cambridge, he spent a post-baccalaureate year at Stanford University, studying political science, American history, and business.

Career
After returning to Britain, Prince William took a position with Lazards, a merchant bank.

He was the second member of the British royal family to work in the civil service or the diplomatic service (the first was his uncle, Prince George, Duke of Kent, in the 1920s). He joined the Commonwealth Office in 1965 and was posted to Lagos as the third secretary at the British High Commission. In 1968, he transferred to Tokyo as second secretary (commercial) in the British Embassy.

By 1970, the health of his father, the Duke of Gloucester, had become critical after further strokes. William had no choice but to resign from the diplomatic service and return to Britain in order to take care of his father's estate and, as he put it, take on the full-time job of a royal prince. On his way back, he represented the Queen at the celebrations to mark the termination of Tonga's status as a protected state. For the next two years, he managed Barnwell Manor and began to carry out public duties as a member of the royal family.

Apart from taking over many engagements his father could no longer perform, William took particular interest in St John Ambulance, where he became increasingly active. He was also President of National Ski Federation Supporters' Association, the Magdalene Society (Cambridge), the East Midlands Tourist Board, and the Royal African Society. His patronages included the Royal Anthropological Institute of Great Britain, the British Schools Exploring Society and the Talyllyn Railway Preservation Society.

Prince William served on some occasions as Counsellor of State in the absence of his cousin, the Queen.

Personal life
The prince was consistently described by friends as adventurous (almost to the point of recklessness), warm, tender and extremely generous. But of all his qualities, the one most often mentioned is that of loyalty to his friends. One account describes how William was particularly kind to friends who were either "ill, unpopular with others, or even downright embarrassing". His status and circumstances had also influenced his personality and he could, at times, be "tiresomely selfish".

Regarding his family, Prince William considered himself extremely lucky compared to other members of the royal family. He had a very close relationship with both his parents, especially with his mother of whom he said, "She is a human being and she must possess some faults. But so far as I am concerned she has no faults at all". He was also very fond of his father, one friend describing William's love and tenderness for him as "infectious". William acknowledged his father couldn't have been very happy as a young man, as a result of the strict upbringing he had received, so he was very grateful to him for the freedom he had given him throughout his life.

Relationships
Former model and stewardess Zsuzsi Starkloff had a long-running relationship with William. The last time they met in person was in August 1970. The relationship with Starkloff was further explored in the 2015 Channel 4 TV documentary, The Other Prince William. Despite the alleged reluctance of senior members of the royal family to take William's relationship with Starkloff seriously, the standards regarding marriage in the royal family at the time were no longer as strict as they had been. Princess Margaret, while not encouraging William, did sympathize with him in this regard, telling him to "wait a bit" and to "see how everything looks" once he returned to Britain. Furthermore, once back in England, Starkloff went to stay with William's family at Barnwell Manor, where his parents were kind and accommodating to her. William's intentions regarding his relationship with Starkloff are unclear. In the year of his death, he gave an interview to Audrey Whiting for the Sunday Mirror, in which he declared that if he ever married, he would do so to a woman not only right for him, but right in "the eyes of other members of the Family".

In the early 1970s, Prince William began a relationship with divorcee Nicole Sieff (née Moschietto) who had two sons from her marriage to Jonathan Sieff.

Health
Shortly before transferring to Tokyo in August 1968, Prince William was examined by a Royal Air Force doctor, Headly Bellringer, at the request of the prince's mother. William told the doctor that he had suffered from jaundice, beginning in December 1965 and lasting several months. He had subsequently noticed that his skin was prone to a blistering rash, particularly on exposure to sunshine. Bellringer tentatively diagnosed porphyria, prescribed sunblock cream and gave him a medical warning card regarding the need to avoid certain medications. Although he was aware of the theory of the royal family's history of porphyria then being proposed by Ida Macalpine and Richard Hunter, he stated he "tried not to let it influence him...with all the symptoms, I was left with little option but to diagnose the Prince's condition as porphyria." William was later examined by haematologists at Addenbrooke's Hospital in Cambridge and also by a Professor Ishihara in Tokyo, both of whom also concluded he was suffering from variegate porphyria, by then in remission.

A member of the British royal family being reliably diagnosed with porphyria added credence to the theory—first proposed by Professor Macalpine in the late 1960s—that porphyria was the source of the ill-health of both Mary, Queen of Scots (an ancestor of both of William's parents) and of George III, and that the disorder had been inherited by some members of the royal families of the UK, Prussia and several German duchies and principalities.

Death
A licensed pilot and President of the British Light Aviation Centre, Prince William owned several aircraft and competed in amateur air show races. On 28 August 1972, he was competing in the Goodyear International Air Trophy at Halfpenny Green near Dudley. Vyrell Mitchell—a pilot with whom the prince had often raced—was listed as a passenger. Shortly after takeoff and while at a very low altitude, the Piper Cherokee banked abruptly to port; there was an extreme increase in the rate of turn and a corresponding loss of altitude. The wing of the plane hit a tree shearing off and the out-of-control plane flipped over and crashed into an earthen bank, bursting into flames. Prince William and Mitchell were killed. The crash happened before 30,000 spectators, the fire took two hours to control, and the bodies were identified at inquest the next day from dental records.

His father, Prince Henry, was in such poor health at the time of his death that his mother hesitated whether to tell him. She later admitted in her memoirs that she did not, but that he may have learned of their son's death from television coverage.

Prince William was buried in the Royal Burial Ground, Frogmore. The comprehensive school in Oundle, which he opened in 1971, was renamed Prince William School in his memory. His will was sealed in London after his death in 1972. His estate was valued at £416,001 (or £3.9 million in 2022 when adjusted for inflation).

William was the heir apparent of his father's peerages, Duke of Gloucester, Earl of Ulster, and Baron Culloden. Upon his death, his younger brother Prince Richard of Gloucester became heir apparent, and succeeded to these peerages in 1974. William was the first grandchild of King George V and Queen Mary to die.

Titles, styles, honours and arms

Titles and styles
18 December 1941 – 28 August 1972: His Royal Highness Prince William of Gloucester

Honours
Counsellor of State, 1962–1971
  Knight of Justice of the Order of St John (KStJ), 1971
Commander-in-Chief of the St John Ambulance Brigade, 1968
Fellow of the Royal Geographical Society (FRGS), 1971

Arms
For his 21st birthday, in 1962, Prince William was granted the use of the Royal Arms, differenced with a label argent of five points, the outer pair and central point bearing lions gules, the inner pair crosses gules.

Ancestry

References

1941 births
1972 deaths
Alumni of Magdalene College, Cambridge
Aviators killed in aviation accidents or incidents in England
British aviators
Burials at the Royal Burial Ground, Frogmore
Heirs apparent who never acceded
House of Windsor
People educated at Eton College
Princes of the United Kingdom
Stanford University alumni
Victims of aviation accidents or incidents in 1972
British princes